Crețeni is a commune located in Vâlcea County, Oltenia, Romania. It is composed of four villages: Crețeni, Izvoru, Mrenești and Streminoasa.

References

Communes in Vâlcea County
Localities in Oltenia